Kouriah  is a town and sub-prefecture in the Coyah Prefecture in the Kindia Region of western Guinea.

References

Sub-prefectures of the Kindia Region